Une histoire banale is a 2014 French drama film written, produced and directed by . It tells the story of Nathalie, a young woman who works in the health care industry and whose life takes an abrupt turn during an encounter with a co-worker on a fateful evening. The film was made on a €8,000 budget which was raised through crowdfunding. Filming took place in Estrougo's flat over a period of three weeks.

Cast 
 Marie Denarnaud as Nathalie 
 Marie-Sohna Conde as Sonha
 Oumar Diaw as Wilson  
 Renaud Astegiani as Damien 
 Vincent Londez as Calixte  
 Steve Tran as Steve 
 Nicolas Gob as Fabrice
 Frédéric Duff-Barbé as the Police Lieutenant
 Naidra Ayadi as Nathalie's colleague
 Benjamin Siksou as the man in the washroom

References

External links 
 

2014 films
2014 drama films
2010s French-language films
French drama films
French independent films
2014 independent films
2010s French films